Limnaecia inconcinna is a moth in the family Cosmopterigidae. It is found on Fiji.

Hostplant: This species feeds on cotton: Gossypium arboreum (Malvaceae).

References

Natural History Museum Lepidoptera generic names catalog

Limnaecia
Taxa named by Edward Meyrick
Moths described in 1923
Moths of Fiji